The 1979 San Francisco Giants season was the Giants' 97th season in Major League Baseball, their 22nd season in San Francisco since their move from New York following the 1957 season, and their 20th at Candlestick Park. The team finished in fourth place in the National League West with a 71–91 record, 19½ games behind the Cincinnati Reds.

Offseason 
 December 4, 1978: Max Venable was drafted by the Giants from the Los Angeles Dodgers in the 1978 rule 5 draft.
 December 5, 1978: Darrell Evans was signed as a free agent by the Giants.
 February 24, 1979: Bill Bordley was signed as an amateur free agent by the Giants.

Regular season

Season standings

Record vs. opponents

Opening Day starters 
Vida Blue
Jack Clark
Darrell Evans
Marc Hill
Mike Ivie
Bill Madlock
Roger Metzger
Billy North
Terry Whitfield

Notable transactions 
 April 1, 1979: Joe Coleman was signed as a free agent by the Giants.
 April 21, 1979: Joe Coleman was released by the Giants.
 June 5, 1979: Scott Garrelts was drafted by the Giants in the 1st round (15th pick) of the 1979 Major League Baseball draft.
 June 13, 1979: John Tamargo was traded by the Giants to the Montreal Expos for a player to be named later and cash. The Expos completed the deal by sending Joe Pettini to the Giants on March 15, 1980.
 June 17, 1979: Dan Gladden was signed by the Giants as an amateur free agent.
 June 28, 1979: Bill Madlock, Lenny Randle and Dave Roberts were traded by the Giants to the Pittsburgh Pirates for Ed Whitson, Fred Breining, and Al Holland.
 June 28, 1979: Héctor Cruz was traded by the Giants to the Cincinnati Reds for Pedro Borbón.

Roster

Player stats

Batting

Starters by position 
Note: Pos = Position; G = Games played; AB = At bats; H = Hits; Avg. = Batting average; HR = Home runs; RBI = Runs batted in

Other batters 
Note: G = Games played; AB = At bats; H = Hits; Avg. = Batting average; HR = Home runs; RBI = Runs batted in

Pitching

Starting pitchers 
Note: G = Games pitched; IP = Innings pitched; W = Wins; L = Losses; ERA = Earned run average; SO = Strikeouts

Other pitchers 
Note: G = Games pitched; IP = Innings pitched; W = Wins; L = Losses; ERA = Earned run average; SO = Strikeouts

Relief pitchers 
Note: G = Games pitched; W = Wins; L = Losses; SV = Saves; ERA = Earned run average; SO = Strikeouts

Awards and honors

All-Stars 
All-Star Game

Farm system

References

External links
 1979 San Francisco Giants team at Baseball-Reference
 1979 San Francisco Giants team page at

San Francisco Giants seasons
San Francisco Giants season
San Fran